Van Houten is a Dutch toponymic surname.

The name literally means "from Houten" which refers to the town of Houten in the Netherlands. In 1947, there were 2,736 people with this surname in the Netherlands and 4,283 people in 2007.

Notable people 
Notable people with the surname include:
 Barbara Elisabeth van Houten (1863–1950), Dutch painter
 Byron Collins Van Houten (1848–1904), U.S. politician
 Carice van Houten (born 1976), Dutch actress, daughter of Theodore
 Coenraad Johannes van Houten (1801–1887), Dutch chocolate maker
 Cornelis Johannes van Houten (1920–2002), Dutch astronomer
 Frans van Houten (born 1960), Dutch business manager
 Gerrit van Houten (1866–1934), Dutch painter
 Harm van Houten (1892–1952), Dutch politician
 Ingrid van Houten-Groeneveld (1921–2015), Dutch astronomer
 Isaac B. Van Houten (1776–1850), U.S. politician
 Jelka van Houten (born 1978), Dutch actress, daughter of Theodore
 John G. Van Houten (1904-1974), U.S. Army general
 John J. Van Houten Jr., U.S. tuba player
 Leslie Van Houten (born 1949), former member of Charles Manson's crime family
 Robert Van Houten (1905–1986), U.S. professor
 Samuel van Houten (1837–1930), Dutch liberal politician
 Sebastiaan van Houten (born 1975), U.S. author and 'fangsmith'
 Sina Mesdag-van Houten (1834–1909), Dutch painter
 Theodore van Houten (1952–2016), Dutch-British author and radio and theater producer

Fictional characters 
Fictional characters with the surname are:
 Elhaym Van Houten, the main heroine from the Xenogears series
 Milhouse Van Houten, character from The Simpsons
 Peter Van Houten, character from the book The Fault in Our Stars by John Green

See also
Van Houten's Cocoa, chocolate powder brand originally made by Coenraad van Houten
1673 van Houten, main belt asteroid named after Cornelis J. van Houten
271P/van Houten–Lemmon, a comet discovered by C.J. van Houten and Ingrid van Houten-Groeneveld
USS Jasmine, a Union Navy ship originally called the Peter B. Van Houten

References 

Dutch-language surnames
Surnames of Dutch origin
Toponymic surnames